, also spelled Kagerou, is the Japanese word for  or , and may refer to:

Video games
 The Japanese Kagero video game series (影牢) translated as shadow dungeon, also knowns as the Deception series outside of Japan and Korea.
 Kagero: Deception II, a video game in the Deception series
 Kagero II: Dark Illusion, its sequel, released in English as Trapt

Ships 
 , a class of vessels in the Imperial Japanese Navy
 , two destroyers of the Imperial Japanese Navy

Films 
 Heat Wave Island, a 1969 film directed by Kaneto Shindo
 Kagero-za, a 1981 film by Seijun Suzuki
 Kagero, a 1991 film directed by Hideo Gosha

Songs 
 "Kagerō", 1972 song by Japanese singer-songwriter Sachiko Kanenobu from the album Misora
 "Kagerō", 2004 single by Japanese rock band Fujifabric
 "Kagerou" (Buck-Tick song), 2006 single by Japanese band Buck-Tick
 "Kagerō" (Scandal song), 2008 single by Japanese band Scandal
 "Kagerou", a song by Babymetal from the album Metal Galaxy

Fictional characters 
 Kagerou (Basilisk), a fictional character from Basilisk: The Kouga Ninja Scrolls
 Kagero, a fictional character from Ninja Scroll
 Kagero Imaizumi, a fictional character from Double Dealing Character
 Kageromaru, a fictional character from InuYasha
 Kagerō Shokiin, a fictional character from Inu x Boku SS
 Kagero, a fictional character from the video game Fire Emblem Fates
 Kagero, a fictional character from Brave Police J-Decker
 Kagero Donne, a fictional character from Scarlet Nexus
 Kagero, a fictional character from Kamen Rider Revice

Others 
 Kagerou (band), a Japanese rock band

 Kagerou, a novel by Hiro Mizushima

 Kagerou, an organization in the manga Usogui

See also 
 Kagerō Nikki
 Kagerou Project, a multi-media project based on a Vocaloid song series

Japanese unisex given names